Howard Beamon Brookins Jr.  (born October 21, 1963) is the Alderman of the 21st Ward of the City of Chicago. He was elected in 2003 and is currently serving his fifth term.

Early life
Brookins, the son of legislator Howard B. Brookins Sr., attended Mendel Catholic High School, Southern Illinois University, and received his JD from Northern Illinois University.

Public service
Brookins is a former Assistant Defender, Assistant States Attorney, and Special Assistant Attorney General. Brookins serves on the Board of Directors for Community Media Workshop and he is active with the 9100 South Union Block Club. Brookins is currently a partner in Brookins and Wilson Law Firm.

In 2008, Brookins unsuccessfully ran for the Democratic nomination in the Cook County State's Attorney election.

On March 14, 2016, Brookins lost a Democratic Congressional primary to Bobby Rush.

Aldermanic career
Brookins was elected as alderman in 2003 after he defeated incumbent Leonard DeVille. He has been reelected in 2007, 2011, 2015, and 2019. He serves on sixteen committees, and chairs two: 

Although he was not able to achieve a majority of votes in the February 27, 2007 general election, he was re-elected in the April 17 runoff election against his challenger Leroy Jones.

Brookins made $114,913 as a part-time alderman in 2011, making him one of the 19 highest paid alderman.  While others chose not to accept annual pay raises while city employees were laid off, Brookins did stating, "Once it's out there, I think for me to give it back to the city for someone else to waste it somewhere else in the city doesn't make sense, and it doesn't help me with my obligations to my family."  An additional source of revenue for Alderman Brookins is his law firm.

On February 28, 2014, Brookins' chief of staff, Curtis V. Thompson Jr. was charged with accepting a $7,500 bribe as part of an undercover corruption probe, and sentenced to 15 months in prison bu U. S. district Judge Samuel Der-Yeghiayan. The Chicago Sun reports that "Thompson helped a federal informant land Brookins' essential support for a liquor license in the 21st Ward in 2013. In exchange, the informant handed Thompson 75 $100 bills stuffed into a Christmas card during a party at Brookins' office, court records show."

On November 13, 2016, Brookins was biking along Cal-Sag Trail when a squirrel jumped into the spokes, and crashed the bike. This left Brookins with a fractured skull, broke his nose, and knocked out a few teeth. The attack came after Brookins had given a series of speeches denouncing squirrels in Chicago saying "It's a pet peeve. It does invoke some giggles. But we are spending too much money on replacing garbage carts because the squirrels continue to eat through 'em," and "I get calls [with residents saying], 'I need a new garbage can.' I just gave you a garbage can. [And the caller says], 'Well, the squirrels ate through it in two days and nobody wants trash throughout the community. So they keep asking us for garbage cans." A survey found that 11% of the cities garbage carts are damaged, costing $300,000 in repairs. At least some of that damage does come from squirrels.

On December 1, 2017, Brookins announced that he was circulating petitions to challenge U.S. Congressman Bobby L. Rush of Chicago's Second Congressional District, but Brookins later withdrew his petitions when Rush ultimately filed to keep his seat, on December 4, 2017.  But three days later, on December 7, 2017, Brookins announced his intent to "leave public service" by circulating petitions to fill a vacancy on the Circuit Court of Cook County when the Illinois Courts Commission forced former-judge Valarie Turner into retirement.  On January 30, 2018, the Cook County Electoral Board removed Brookins from the ballot for that judicial vacancy after it was determined that Brookins was between 250 to 398 short of the required signatures to get on the ballot.

In the runoff of the 2019 Chicago mayoral election, Brookins endorsed Toni Preckwinkle.

Personal life
Brookins is married to Ebony Taylor-Brookins and has two children: Howard Beamon Brookins III and 
Harihson B. Brookins.

References

http://prev.dailyherald.com/story/?id=125243

http://chicago.suntimes.com/news-chicago/7/71/639649/ex-chief-staff-ald-brookins-sentenced-15-months-prison

External links
 CivicFootprint: 21st ward
Video "Run for Cook County States Attorney"
Alderman Howard Brookins Jr. Website

1963 births
21st-century American politicians
Chicago City Council members
Illinois Democrats
Illinois lawyers
Living people
Northern Illinois University alumni
Southern Illinois University alumni